Tre Colli is a village in Tuscany, central Italy, administratively a frazione of the comune of Calci, province of Pisa.

Tre Colli is about 14 km from Pisa and 3 km from Calci.

References

Bibliography 
 

Frazioni of the Province of Pisa